Crawford House was a grand hotel in Crawford Notch, New Hampshire, United States. The original hotel was built in 1850 and destroyed by fire in 1859. It was replaced by a second Crawford House resort that was the largest hotel in the White Mountains at the time. It was further expanded over time to accommodate 400 guests. The hotel featured wide porches and views of Crawford Notch. It eventually fell into disrepair and then closed in 1975. The hotel building was destroyed by fire in November 1977.

The property that Crawford House stood on was later acquired by the Appalachian Mountain Club, which built the extant Highland Center there. The neighboring Crawford Depot was added to the National Register of Historic Places in 1982.

See also
New Hampshire Historical Marker No. 87: Crawford House

References

Further reading

Defunct hotels in New Hampshire
Buildings and structures in Coös County, New Hampshire
Hotel buildings completed in 1850
1850 establishments in New Hampshire
Buildings and structures demolished in 1859
1977 disestablishments in New Hampshire
Buildings and structures demolished in 1977
Demolished hotels in the United States
Demolished buildings and structures in New Hampshire